Burma competed at the 1984 Summer Paralympics in Stoke Mandeville, Great Britain and New York City, United States. 10 competitors from Burma won 4 medals, 1 gold, 2 silver and 1 bronze and finished 32nd in the medal table.

See also 
 Burma at the Paralympics
 Burma at the 1984 Summer Olympics

References 

1984
Nations at the 1984 Summer Paralympics
1984 in Burmese sport